The Monte Carlo chess tournament was established in 1901. There were a series of very strong tournaments held in Monte Carlo, from 1901 to 1904, and again after a long break from 1967 to 1969.

1901

{|class="wikitable"
|  style="background:#f0f0f0;"|#
|  style="background:#f0f0f0;"|Player
|  style="background:#f0f0f0;"|1
|  style="background:#f0f0f0;"|2
|  style="background:#f0f0f0;"|3
|  style="background:#f0f0f0;"|4
|  style="background:#f0f0f0;"|5
|  style="background:#f0f0f0;"|6
|  style="background:#f0f0f0;"|7
|  style="background:#f0f0f0;"|8
|  style="background:#f0f0f0;"|9
|  style="background:#f0f0f0;"|10
|  style="background:#f0f0f0;"|11
|  style="background:#f0f0f0;"|12
|  style="background:#f0f0f0;"|13
|  style="background:#f0f0f0;"|14
|  style="background:#f0f0f0;"|Total
|-
| 1 ||  || * || 1 || 1 || 1 || 0 || 1 || 1 || 1 || ½ || W || 1 || 0 || 1 || 1  || 10.25
|-
| 2 ||   ||  0 || * || 0 || W || ½ || 1 || 1 || W || 1 || ½ || 1 || 1 || 1 || 1   || 9.50
|-
| 3 ||   || 0 || 1 || * || 0 || ½ || 1 || 1 || 0 || 1 || 1 || 1 || 1 || ½ || 1   || 9.00
|-
| 4  ||   ||    0 || L || 1 || * || ½ || 0 || 1 || 1 || W || ½ || 1 || 1 || 1 || 1   || 9.00
|-
| 5  ||  || 1 || ½ || ½ || ½ || * || ½ || W || ½ || 0 || 1 || 1 || ½ || W || 1  ||  8.50
|-
| 6  ||  || 0 || 0 || 0 || 1 || ½ || * || 0 || ½ || 1 || 1 || 1 || 1 || 0 || 1 ||   7.00
|-
| 7  ||  ||  0 || 0 || 0 || 0 || L || 1 || * || 0 || 1 || 1 || L || 1 || 1 || 1  ||  6.50
|-
| 8 ||  ||    0 || L || 1 || 0 || ½ || ½ || 1 || * || 0 || W || 0 || ½ || 1 || 1 ||   6.50
|-
| 9  ||  || ½ || 0 || 0 || L || 1 || 0 || 0 || 1 || * || L || 1 || ½ || ½ || 1 ||   6.00   
|-
| 10 ||  || L || ½ || 0 || ½ || 0 || 0 || 0 || L || W || * || 1 || 1 || L || 1  ||  5.50
|-
| 11 ||  || 0 || 0 || 0 || 0 || 0 || 0 || W || 1 || 0 || 0 || * || 1 || 1 || 1 ||   4.75
|-
| 12 ||  || 1 || 0 || 0 || 0 || ½ || 0 || 0 || ½ || ½ || 0 || 0 || * || 1 || W ||   4.25
|-
| 13 ||  || 0 || 0 || ½ || 0 || L || 1 || 0 || 0 || ½ || W || 0 || 0 || * || 1 ||  4.00  
|-
| | 14 ||  || 0 || 0 || 0 || 0 || 0 ||  0 || 0 || 0 || 0 || 0 || 0 || L || 0 || *  || 0.25
|}

The notation and point count was as follows (drawn games were replayed):

W means ½ for the first, 1 the second game = 3/4 points
½ means ½ for the first, ½ the second game = 1/2 points
L means ½ for the first, 0 the second game = 1/4 points

1902

{|class="wikitable"
|  style="background:#f0f0f0;"|#
|  style="background:#f0f0f0;"|Player
|  style="background:#f0f0f0;"|1
|  style="background:#f0f0f0;"|2
|  style="background:#f0f0f0;"|3
|  style="background:#f0f0f0;"|4
|  style="background:#f0f0f0;"|5
|  style="background:#f0f0f0;"|6
|  style="background:#f0f0f0;"|7
|  style="background:#f0f0f0;"|8
|  style="background:#f0f0f0;"|9
|  style="background:#f0f0f0;"|10
|  style="background:#f0f0f0;"|11
|  style="background:#f0f0f0;"|12
|  style="background:#f0f0f0;"|13
|  style="background:#f0f0f0;"|14
|  style="background:#f0f0f0;"|15
|  style="background:#f0f0f0;"|16
|  style="background:#f0f0f0;"|17
|  style="background:#f0f0f0;"|18
|  style="background:#f0f0f0;"|19
|  style="background:#f0f0f0;"|20
|  style="background:#f0f0f0;"|Total
|-
| 1|| ||*||1||½||1||0||½||1||½||1||0||1||W||½||1||1||1||1||1||1||1||14.75
|-
| 2||||0||*||1||½||1||1||W||L||1||W||1||1||1||1||L||1||1||0||1||1||14.50
|-
| 3|| ||½||0||*||1||0||1||1||W||1||1||0||1||0||1||1||1||1||W||1||1||14.00
|-
| 4|| ||0||½||0||*||½||1||½||1||0||1||W||1||½||W||1||1||1||W||1||1||13.25
|-
| 5-7|| ||1||0||1||½||*||0||½||0||0||1||1||½||W||½||½||W||1||1||1||1||12.00
|-
| 5-7|| ||½||0||0||0||1||*||1||0||0||W||½||1||1||½||W||1||1||1||1||1||12.00
|-
| 5-7|| ||0||L||0||½||½||0||*||1||1||W||L||0||1||1||1||W||1||1||1||1||12.00
|-
| 8|| ||½||W||L||0||1||1||0||*||0||1||0||1||1||1||1||0||0||1||1||1||11.50
|-
| 9||||0||0||0||1||1||1||0||1||*||0||1||0||1||L||0||1||1||W||1||1||11.00
|-
| 10|| ||1||L||0||0||0||L||L||0||1||*||1||½||0||1||1||½||1||1||1||1||10.75
|-
| 11||||0||0||1||L||0||½||W||1||0||0||*||1||0½||L||½||0||1||1||1||1||9.50
|-
| 12|| ||L||0||0||0||½||0||1||0||1||½||0||*||0||1||1||W||1||L||1||1||9.25
|-
| 13|| ||½||0||1||½||L||0||0||0||0||1||W||1||*||0||½||1||0||½||1||1||9.00
|-
| 14|| ||0||0||0||L||½||½||0||0||W||0||W||0||1||*||W||0||1||1||1||1||8.50
|-
| 15|| ||0||W||0||0||½||L||0||0||1||0||½||0||½||L||*||0||1||1||1||1||7.75
|-
| 16|| ||0||0||0||0||L||0||L||1||0||½||1||L||0||1||1||*||0||1||0||1||7.25
|-
| 17|| ||0||0||0||0||0||0||0||1||0||0||0||0||1||0||0||1||*||½||½||1||5.00
|-
| 18|| ||0||1||L||L||0||0||0||0||L||0||0||W||½||0||0||0||½||*||1||0||4.50
|-
| 19||||0||0||0||0||0||0||0||0||0||0||0||0||0||0||0||1||½||0||*||1||2.50
|-
| 20||||0||0||0||0||0||0||0||0||0||0||0||0||0||0||0||0||0||1||0||*||1.00
|}
The notation and point count is the same as in 1901.

1903

{|class="wikitable"
|  style="background:#f0f0f0;"|#
|  style="background:#f0f0f0;"|Player
|  style="background:#f0f0f0;"|1
|  style="background:#f0f0f0;"|2
|  style="background:#f0f0f0;"|3
|  style="background:#f0f0f0;"|4
|  style="background:#f0f0f0;"|5
|  style="background:#f0f0f0;"|6
|  style="background:#f0f0f0;"|7
|  style="background:#f0f0f0;"|8
|  style="background:#f0f0f0;"|9
|  style="background:#f0f0f0;"|10
|  style="background:#f0f0f0;"|11
|  style="background:#f0f0f0;"|12
|  style="background:#f0f0f0;"|13
|  style="background:#f0f0f0;"|14
|  style="background:#f0f0f0;"|Total
|-
|1  || ||** ||½½ ||½1 ||0½ ||0½ ||01 ||11 ||11 ||11 ||11 ||1½ ||11 ||11 ||11  ||20.0
|-
| 2  || ||½½ ||** ||½½ ||½½ ||½½ ||11 ||01 ||11 ||01 ||01 ||11 ||11 ||11 ||11  ||19.0
|-
| 3  || ||½0 ||½½ ||** ||11 ||11 ||1½ ||1½ ||01 ||0½ ||½1 ||1½ ||1½ ||11 ||11  ||18.5
|-
| 4  || ||1½ ||½½ ||00 ||** ||½½ ||½1 ||1½ ||½1 ||01 ||½0 ||1½ ||11 ||11 ||11  ||17.0
|-
| 5  || ||1½ ||½½ ||00 ||½½ ||** ||10 ||½½ ||1½ ||½1 ||10 ||01 ||11 ||11 ||11  ||16.5
|-
| 6  || || 10 ||00 ||0½ ||½0 ||01 ||** ||1½ ||11 ||1½ ||1½ ||½1 ||½0 ||11 ||11  ||15.5
|-
| 7  || || 00 ||10 ||0½ ||0½ ||½½ ||0½ ||** ||01 ||1½ ||11 ||11 ||01 ||01 ||11  ||14.0
|-
| 8 || || 00 ||00 ||10 ||½0 ||0½ ||00 ||10 ||** ||11 ||11 ||1½ ||01 ||½1 ||11  ||13.0
|-
| 9  || || 00 ||10 ||1½ ||10 ||½0 ||0½ ||0½ ||00 ||** ||11 ||01 ||01 ||10 ||11  ||12.0
|-
| 10  ||  ||00 ||10 ||½0 ||½1 ||01 ||0½ ||00 ||00 ||00 ||** ||½½ ||11 ||10 ||11  ||10.5
|-
| 11  || || 0½ ||00 ||0½ ||0½ ||10 ||½0 ||00 ||0½ ||10 ||½½ ||** ||½1 ||1½ ||11  ||10.5
|-
| 12  || || 00 ||00 ||0½ ||00 ||00 ||½1 ||10 ||10 ||10 ||00 ||½0 ||** ||0½ ||11  || 8.0
|-
| 13  || || 00 ||00 ||00 ||00 ||00 ||00 ||10 ||½0 ||01 ||01 ||0½ ||1½ ||** ||11   ||7.5
|-
| 14  || || 00 ||00 ||00 ||00 ||00 ||00 ||00 ||00 ||00 ||00 ||00 ||00 ||00 ||**   ||0.0
|}

1904

{|class="wikitable"
|  style="background:#f0f0f0;"|#
|  style="background:#f0f0f0;"|Player
|  style="background:#f0f0f0;"|1
|  style="background:#f0f0f0;"|2
|  style="background:#f0f0f0;"|3
|  style="background:#f0f0f0;"|4
|  style="background:#f0f0f0;"|5
|  style="background:#f0f0f0;"|6
|  style="background:#f0f0f0;"|Total
|-
| 1 ||   || ** || ½½ || ½1 || 1½ || ½1 || 11  ||  7.5
|-
| 2 ||    || ½½ || ** || ½½ || ½½ || 11 || 11  ||  7.0
|-
| 3 ||    || ½0 || ½½ || ** || 1½ || 1½ || 11  ||  6.5
|-
| 4 ||    || 0½ || ½½ || 0½ || ** || 0½ || ½1 || 4.0
|-
| 5 ||    ||      ½0 || 00 || 0½ || 1½ || ** || 0½  ||  3.0
|-
| 6 ||    ||  00 || 00 || 00 || ½0 || 1½ || **  ||  2.0
|}

1904, Rice Gambit tournament
Also in 1904, a thematic tournament on the King's Gambit, Rice Gambit was held.

{|class="wikitable"
|  style="background:#f0f0f0;"|#
|  style="background:#f0f0f0;"|Player
|  style="background:#f0f0f0;"|1
|  style="background:#f0f0f0;"|2
|  style="background:#f0f0f0;"|3
|  style="background:#f0f0f0;"|4
|  style="background:#f0f0f0;"|5
|  style="background:#f0f0f0;"|6
|  style="background:#f0f0f0;"|Total
|-
| 1-2 ||  || ** || 11 || 01 || 01 || 01 || 01  ||  6.0
|-
| 1-2 ||   ||    00 || ** || 11 || 10 || 01 || 11 ||  6.0
|-
| 3 ||   || 10 || 00 || ** || ½1 || ½1 || ½1 || 5.5
|-
| 4 ||   || 10 || 01 || ½0 || ** || 10 || 1½  || 5.0
|-
| 5 ||   ||  10 || 10 || ½0 || 01 || ** || 10 ||   4.5
|-
| 6 ||   || 10  || 00 || ½0 || 0½ || 01 || **  ||  3.0
|}

1967

{|class="wikitable"
|  style="background:#f0f0f0;"|#
|  style="background:#f0f0f0;"|Player
|  style="background:#f0f0f0;"|1
|  style="background:#f0f0f0;"|2
|  style="background:#f0f0f0;"|3
|  style="background:#f0f0f0;"|4
|  style="background:#f0f0f0;"|5
|  style="background:#f0f0f0;"|6
|  style="background:#f0f0f0;"|7
|  style="background:#f0f0f0;"|8
|  style="background:#f0f0f0;"|9
|  style="background:#f0f0f0;"|10
|  style="background:#f0f0f0;"|Total
|-
| 1 ||  || x||½||0||1||½||1||1||1||1||1||7.0 
|-
| 2 ||   || ½||x||½||½||1||½||½||1||1||1||6.5 
|-
| 3 ||  ||1||½||x||0||½||½||1||½||1||1||6.0 
|-
| 4 ||  || 0||½||1||x||0||1||1||½||1||1||6.0 
|-
| 5  ||  ||½||0||½||1||x||½||½||½||½||1||5.0 
|-
| 6 ||  ||  0||½||½||0||½||x||½||½||1||1||4.5 
|-
| 7 ||  ||  0||½||0||0||½||½||x||1||1||1||4.5 
|-
| 8  ||  || 0||0||½||½||½||½||0||x||1||1||4.0 
|-
|  9  ||  || 0||0||0||0||½||0||0||0||x||½||1.0 
|-
| 10 ||  ||0||0||0||0||0||0||0||0||½||x||0.5 
|}

1968

{|class="wikitable"
|  style="background:#f0f0f0;"|#
|  style="background:#f0f0f0;"|Player
|  style="background:#f0f0f0;"|1
|  style="background:#f0f0f0;"|2
|  style="background:#f0f0f0;"|3
|  style="background:#f0f0f0;"|4
|  style="background:#f0f0f0;"|5
|  style="background:#f0f0f0;"|6
|  style="background:#f0f0f0;"|7
|  style="background:#f0f0f0;"|8
|  style="background:#f0f0f0;"|9
|  style="background:#f0f0f0;"|10
|  style="background:#f0f0f0;"|11
|  style="background:#f0f0f0;"|12
|  style="background:#f0f0f0;"|13
|  style="background:#f0f0f0;"|14
|  style="background:#f0f0f0;"|Total
|-
| 1 ||  || *||½||½||½||0||½||1||½||1||1||1||1||1||1|| 9.5
|-
| 2 ||  ||½||*||½||½||½||1||½||1||½||½||½||1||1||1|| 9
|-
| 3-4 ||  ||½||½||*||½||½||1||½||½||½||½||½||1||1||1|| 8.5
|-
| 3-4 ||  } ||½||½||½||*||½||½||½||½||1||½||½||1||1||1|| 8.5
|-
| 5 ||  ||1||½||½||½||*||0||½||½||½||½||1||½||1||1|| 8
|-
| 6-8 ||  ||½||0||0||½||1||*||½||½||½||1||1||1||0||1|| 7.5
|-
| 6-8 ||  ||0||½||½||½||½||½||*||½||1||½||½||½||1||1|| 7.5
|-
| 6-8 ||  ||  ½||0||½||½||½||½||½||*||½||1||½||½||1||1||7.5
|-
| 9 ||  ||0||½||½||0||½||½||0||½||*||½||1||½||1||1|| 6.5
|-
| 10-11 ||  ||0||½||½||½||½||0||½||0||½||*||0||½||1||1|| 5.5
|-
| 10-11 ||  ||0||½||½||½||0||0||½||½||0||1||*||0||1||1|| 5.5
|-
| 12 ||  ||0||0||0||0||½||0||½||½||½||½||1||*||1||½|| 5
|-
| 13 ||  ||0||0||0||0||0||1||0||0||0||0||0||0||*||½|| 1.5
|-
| 14 ||  ||  0||0||0||0||0||0||0||0||0||0||0||½||½||*||1
|}

1969

{|class="wikitable"
|  style="background:#f0f0f0;"|#
|  style="background:#f0f0f0;"|Player
|  style="background:#f0f0f0;"|1
|  style="background:#f0f0f0;"|2
|  style="background:#f0f0f0;"|3
|  style="background:#f0f0f0;"|4
|  style="background:#f0f0f0;"|5
|  style="background:#f0f0f0;"|6
|  style="background:#f0f0f0;"|7
|  style="background:#f0f0f0;"|8
|  style="background:#f0f0f0;"|9
|  style="background:#f0f0f0;"|10
|  style="background:#f0f0f0;"|11
|  style="background:#f0f0f0;"|12
|  style="background:#f0f0f0;"|Total
|-
| 1 ||  ||*||½||½||½||1||1||½||1||½||1||½||1||8
|-
| 2 ||  ||½||*||0||½||1||1||1||½||½||1||1||1||8
|-
| 3 ||  ||½||1||*||½||½||½||½||½||½||½||1||1|| 7
|-
| 4 ||  ||½||½||½||*||½||½||½||½||½||½||1||1|| 6.5
|-
| 5 ||  ||0||0||½||½||*||½||½||1||½||1||1||1|| 6.5
|-
| 6 ||  ||0||0||½||½||½||*||½||½||1||½||1||1|| 6
|-
| 7 ||  ||½||0||½||½||½||½||*||0||1||1||½||½|| 5.5
|-
| 8 ||  ||0||½||½||½||0||½||1||*||½||0||½||1|| 5
|-
| 9 ||  ||½||½||½||½||½||0||0||½||*||½||0||1|| 4.5
|-
| 10 ||  ||0||0||½||½||0||½||0||1||½||*||1||½|| 4.5
|-
| 11 ||  ||½||0||0||0||0||0||½||½||1||0||*||0|| 2.5
|-
| 12 ||  ||0||0||0||0||0||0||½||0||0||½||1||*|| 2
|}

References

Chess competitions
Chess in Monaco
1901 in chess
1969 in chess
Recurring sporting events established in 1901
Recurring sporting events disestablished in 1969
Sports competitions in Monaco
1901 establishments in Monaco